The  is a 6.4 km long railway line operated by the privately owned Chōshi Electric Railway between Chōshi and Tokawa stations in Chiba Prefecture, Japan.

It is the Chōshi Electric Railway's only line and is facing declining ridership. The company ventured into selling nure-senbei (moist senbei rice crackers) to subsidize its operations, and the profits from confectionery sales are now double those from its railway operations.

Service pattern
All trains stop at all stations, with trains passing on the single line at Kasagami-Kurohae Station. Since 21 November 2013, one train per hour runs during the daytime.

Previously, two to three trains operated per hour throughout the day. In the past, two- or three-car formations were operated on New Year's Day to transport passengers to see the first sunrise of the year at the popular coastal viewing point in Inubōsaki.

Stations

Rolling stock
 2000 series 2-car EMUs (x2, since 24 July 2010), former Iyo Railway 800 series (originally Keio Corporation 2010 series built in 1962)
 3000 series 2-car EMU (since 26 March 2016), former Iyo Railway 700 series (originally Keio 5000 series)
 DeKi 3 electric locomotive, built in 1922 by AEG in Germany, based at Nakanochō Depot

In 2007, it was announced that former Keio 3000 series stainless steel EMUs converted to 2-car sets would be purchased to replace the three vintage 700 and 800 series cars still in operation. This plan was however cancelled due to the cost of converting the 1,500 V DC cars to 600 V DC operation. Instead, two pairs of former Iyo Railway 800 series EMU cars were purchased in 2009, and these entered service in July 2010 following conversion work, becoming the 2000 series.

In September 2015, a two-car 700 series EMU was purchased from the Iyo Railway for 1.3 million yen. The train entered service on the line in March 2016, following repainting into a two-tone blue livery.

Past rolling stock
 0-6-0T steam locomotives 1 and 2 (former JNR 1102 and 1107) (Choshi Sightseeing Railway, December 1913 - November 1917)
 Ro 1, RoHa 1, Ha 1, HaNi 1 4-wheel coaches (Choshi Sightseeing Railway, December 1913 - November 1917)
 HaFu 1 and HaFu 2 non-powered trailer cars, withdrawn in September 1978 and cut up in 1979
 100 series EMU car DeHa 101, built 1939, withdrawn in 1999, and scrapped in September 2009
 200 series EMU car DeHa 201, (former Keisei MoNi 7, built in 1925), operated from 1949 until 1978, and officially withdrawn in 1979
 300 series EMU car DeHa 301 (former Tsurumi Rinkō Railway MoHa 115, built in 1930), operated from 1951, withdrawn in 2008, scrapped in October 2009
 500 series EMU car DeHa 501 (former Ueda Kōtsū MoHa 2321, built in 1939), operated from 1972, later sectioned at Inuboh Station, and cut up on-site in July 2012
 700 series EMU car DeHa 701 (former Ohmi Railway MoHa 50 built in 1942), withdrawn in September 2010
 700 series EMU car DeHa 702 (former Ohmi Railway MoHa 50, built 1942), withdrawn in January 2010
 800 series EMU car DeHa 801 (former Iyo Railway MoHa 106 built in 1950), withdrawn in September 2010 
 Yu 101 open car, (former WaMu 80000 freight car number WaMu 183983, built in 1969), operated from 4 August 1985, but taken out of service since 2004 due to safety regulations, and stored first at Tokawa Station and then at Kasagami-Kurohae Station before being official withdrawn on 30 June 2012
 1000 series EMU car 1001 (former TRTA 2000 series built in 1960), withdrawn in February 2016
 1000 series EMU car 1002 (former TRTA 2000 series built in 1959), withdrawn in February 2015

History

Chōshi Sightseeing Railway (1913-1917)

The  gauge line was laid by a team of 235 army engineers in just 11 days. The line used two former JNR 0-6-0T steam locomotives built by Nasmyth, Wilson in the UK. These were numbered 1 and 2 (former JNR numbers 1102 and 1107 respectively).

Faced with poor ridership figures and increases in material costs caused by the outset of the First World War, the operating company announced its intention to close the line and sell off the infrastructure. This was met with violent protests from local residents, which resulted in the arrest of three people, recorded as the first public protest against railway closure plans in Japan. Despite the protests, the railway company terminated services on the line from the afternoon of 20 November 1917, and formally closed the line as of 30 November. The line's trackbed was converted to a dedicated bus route, but the station buildings remained intact. The two steam locomotives, 1 and 2, were sold to Yawata Steel Works, where they were renumbered 200 and 201, and operated until after the Second World War. The line's four passenger coaches were sold to the Rikuu Railway (now part of the JR Gono Line) in Aomori Prefecture, ultimately becoming numbers Ro 790, Ha 2555, Ha 2556, and HaNi 3680 in JNR days.

Chōshi Railway (1922-1948)
Rolling stock consisted of two petrol-engined locomotives and two two-axle carriages. The locomotives proved unreliable, however, and the line was electrified at 600 V DC from 1 July 1925, with a fleet of three electric cars purchased from the former  (present-day JR Iida Line).

Services on the line were suspended from 20 July 1945, following air raid damage. A C class steam tank locomotive was borrowed from JNR to resume operations on the line from December 1945, and electric train operations resumed from 4 April 1946.

Chōshi Electric Railway (1948-)
On 20 August 1948, the operating company was renamed .

In 1956, a private track was laid directly from Chōshi Station to the nearby Yamasa soy sauce factory, which virtually eliminated freight operations handled by the Chōshi Electric Railway. And, this company was invested by Chiba Kotsu which has been an affiliated company of Keisei Electric Railway on 1 November 1960 and had been a subsidiary of Keisei Group since then until 1990.
In 1963, a decision was made to close the line, but this decision was overturned following opposition from the local communities and funding from Chōshi City. To the present day, the line is largely subsidized by Chiba Prefecture and Chōshi City.
Freight operations on the line were discontinued from 1 February 1984. On 21 December 1989, Chiba Kotsu transferred a 52% share of this company which was owned by Chiba Kotsu to Choden Kosan which was managed by Uchino Komuten. That's because this railway line was competitive with a lot of bus routes which were operated by Chiba Kotsu of the parent company, which caused that a bus company and railway company both were in red. After that this company got to a subsidiary of Choden Kosan in January 1990 by transferring right to management. From 1 April 1995, operations on the line switched to wanman driver-only operation because this company would extremely decrease expenditures. But, the pure loss of the management had increased because Uchinoya Komuten of a parent company had nine hundred ninety billion yen as debt and took an application of bankruptcy.

From 21 November 2013, services were cut back from two trains per hour to one train per hour during the daytime.

In 2019, the company announced the production of a movie called . The 84 minute long horror comedy is set on the Chōshi Electric Railway line and was first shown in cinemas in 2020.

As a response to the COVID-19 pandemic starting in early 2020 and the associated dramatic decline in passenger numbers, the company has started to produce and publish short videos about the railway on YouTube. The channel is called  and contains videos about various places on and around the railway, such as the railway shed, the main office and various stations along the line. The videos often feature different staff members, mainly Katsuki Takemoto (CEO), Riho Sodeyama (conductor) and more recently also Kazuki Fukushima, a young station attendant.

Accidents
A head-on collision occurred in June 1995 north of Kasagami-Kurohae Station between DeHa 701 on a down (Tokawa-bound) service and DeHa 1001 on an up (Chōshi-bound) service. Both cars sustained front-end damage. DeHa 701 was returned to service in April 1996 following repairs and repainting back into the standard livery of dark brown and red.

On 11 January 2014, at 08:19, 2000 series 2-car EMU set 2002 from Tokawa to Choshi derailed on points on the approach to Kasagami-Kurohae Station. Two of the train's bogies were derailed, but the train remained upright and none of the nine passengers on board was injured.

Passenger statistics
The annual passenger statistics for past years are as shown below.

In popular culture
Tokawa Station on the line was used as a filming location for the 1985 NHK TV drama series .

The line formed the backdrop for the 2015 novel  written by Midori Yoshino. The book was made into a film, titled , scheduled to be released in Japan in 2017.

See also
Chiba Kotsu (The former parent company)

References

External links

 Chōshi Electric Railway official website　
 Chōshi Electric Railway official web shop　

 
Railway lines in Japan
Railway lines in Chiba Prefecture
Railway lines opened in 1923
1067 mm gauge railways in Japan
600 V DC railway electrification
1923 establishments in Japan